Talara thea is a moth in the subfamily Arctiinae. It was described by Schaus in 1924. It is found in Ecuador.

References

Natural History Museum Lepidoptera generic names catalog

Moths described in 1924
Lithosiini